KPTX (98.3 FM, "98X FM West Texas Best") is a radio station broadcasting an adult contemporary music format. Licensed to Pecos, Texas, United States, the station serves the Odessa-Midland area. The station is currently owned by Parday and features programming from Citadel Broadcasting.

References

External links

PTX